Citharinus eburneensis is a species of lutefish from tropical Africa. It is known from the coastal rivers of Côte d'Ivoire and can get as large as 17.5 cm.

References

Gosse, J.-P., 1990. Citharinidae. p. 261-268. In C. Lévêque, D. Paugy and G.G. Teugels (eds.) Faune des poissons d'eaux douces et saumâtres de l'Afrique de l'Ouest. Tome I. Coll. Faune Tropicale n° XXVIII. Musée Royal de l'Afrique Centrale, Tervuren and O.R.S.T.O.M., Paris, 384 p.

Characiformes
Fish of Africa
Taxa named by Jacques Daget
Fish described in 1962